The Chinese Ambassador to Kiribati is the official representative of the People's Republic of China to Kiribati.

Between 2003 and 2019, Kiribati has maintained diplomatic relations with the Republic of China, but these were severed by the ROC when Kiribati established relations with the People's Republic of China in 2019.

List of representatives (People's Republic of China, until 2003)

List of representatives (Republic of China, from 2003, until 2019)

List of representatives (People's Republic of China, from 2019)

See also
China–Kiribati relations

References

Other references 
 Ministry of Foreign Affairs of the People's Republic of China, Chinese Ambassadors to Kiribati, 
 驻基里巴斯共和国历任大使, 
 
 

 
Kiribati
China